Ruslan Ibragim-ogly Safarov (born 6 September 1979) is a former Russian professional football player.

Club career
He played in the Russian Football National League for FC Avangard Kursk in 2007.

External links
 

1979 births
People from Sumgait
Living people
Russian footballers
Association football goalkeepers
FC Avangard Kursk players